Moradabad Nagar is one of the 403 Legislative Assembly constituencies of Uttar Pradesh state in India.

It is part of Moradabad district.

Members of Legislative Assembly
1951: Kedar Nath, Indian National Congress
1957: Halimuddin, Independent
1962: Halimuddin, Republican Party of India
1967: Onkar Saran, Indian National Congress
1969: Halimuddin Rahat Maulaey, Independent
1974: Dinesh Chandra Rastogi, Bharatiya Jana Sangh
1977: Dinesh Chandra Rastogi, Janata Party
1980: Hafiz Mohammad Siddiq, Indian National Congress
1985: Pushpa Singhal, Indian National Congress
1989: Shamim Ahmad Khan, Janata Dal
1991: Zahid Husain, Janata Dal
1993: Sandeep Agarwal, Bharatiya Janata Party
1996: Sandeep Agarwal, Bharatiya Janata Party
2002: Sandeep Agarwal, Bharatiya Janata Party
2007: Sandeep Agarwal, Samajwadi Party
2012: Mohammad Yusuf Ansari, Samajwadi Party

Election results

2022

2017

See also
 List of constituencies of the Uttar Pradesh Legislative Assembly
 Moradabad district

References

External links
 Official Site of Legislature in Uttar Pradesh
Uttar Pradesh Government website
UP Assembly
 

Moradabad district
Assembly constituencies of Uttar Pradesh
Moradabad